The Third National Census of Population of the Dominican Republic was raised on 6 August 1950, during the presidency of Rafael Leónidas Trujillo, after the Decree No.6091 of 20 October 1949. 

This census collected information on sex, occupation, age, fertility, race, religion, marital status, nationality, literacy, ability to vote, and housing.

General results

Provincial and communal results

See also 
 1920 Santo Domingo Census
 1960 Dominican Republic Census
 1970 Dominican Republic Census
 2010 Dominican Republic Census
 2022 Dominican Republic Census

Sources 
 National office of the Census (1958). Third National Census of Population, 1950.

References 

Censuses in the Dominican Republic
1950s in the Dominican Republic
Dominican Republic